Jalan Kulim–Mahang, Federal Route 169 (formerly Kedah state route K115), is a federal road in Kedah, Malaysia.

At most sections, the Federal Route 169 was built under the JKR R5 road standard, allowing maximum speed limit of up to 90 km/h.

List of junctions

References

Malaysian Federal Roads